Professor Mendel Stromm is a supervillain appearing in American comic books published by Marvel Comics. The character has also been known as the Robot Master and Gaunt.

Publication history 

Stromm first appeared in The Amazing Spider-Man #37 (June 1966), and was created by Stan Lee and Steve Ditko.

Fictional character biography 
Professor Mendel Stromm was Norman Osborn's college professor and later became a partner in OsCorp Industries. His early research was on a chemical that would provide enhanced strength in its test subjects and would eventually turn Osborn into the Green Goblin. Osborn, wanting the formula for himself, discovered that Stromm had been embezzling funds from OsCorp. Stromm explained that he was merely borrowing them, but Osborn turned him over to the police. After several years in prison, Stromm was released and tried to kill Osborn for revenge using deadly robots. He was stopped by Spider-Man and seemingly died of a heart attack when he was nearly shot.

Stromm had made plans for his death, however, by arranging to have his Spirit transferred to a robot double. Now calling himself "the Robot Master", Stromm returned in Spectacular Spider-Man #68 (July 1982).  Spider-Man defeated and destroyed the robot double.

In Spectacular Spider-Man #233 (April 1996), Stromm returned again, this time as a cyborg called "Gaunt". It was revealed that he survived through a cybernetic suit fused to his body – attached by none other than Osborn. Osborn had discovered that Stromm had survived his heart attack thanks to the Goblin Formula, but on a level of consciousness supported only by his suit. Eventually, via Seward Trainer, he was cured of his need for the suit and came back in a large suit of robotic armor, only for it to be destroyed by Ben Reilly and Peter Parker, despite Stromm's attempt to defeat them both with two flying robots and three childlike androids attacking simultaneously. Shortly afterward, Norman Osborn knocked him out with a laser blast and left him for dead, though he survived and only had amnesia. He came back in yet another robot suit, only to be stopped by Spider-Man once again.

In Peter Parker: Spider-Man Vol 1 #27 (March 2001), Stromm tried to create a sentient robot to kill Osborn, but it turned on him and destroyed his body, keeping his severed head alive. This artificial intelligence then attempted to take over New York City's electrical grid, but was stopped when Spider-Man fought his way into its core processor and uploaded a computer virus into it, putting both the A.I. and Mendel into a comatose state.

The artificial intelligence took over Electro's body and tried to use his powers to create a horde of self spawning robots, but after the interference of Spider-Man the A.I. altered Spidey's spider sense, after which Spider-Man defeated the A.I..

In Penance: Relentless (2007), it is revealed that Spider-Man tipped S.H.I.E.L.D. off to Stromm's whereabouts and that they were able to rescue him from the suspended loop he was stuck in. He eagerly registered as part of the Initiative. Later, Penance goes AWOL on the Thunderbolts and stages an assault on Stromm's home, threatening to kill him unless Stromm tells him how to activate nuclear launch codes Penance has stolen in a bid to get Nitro deported from Latveria.

During the Civil War II storyline, Mendel Stromm meets Clayton Cole at the henchman bar called Moynihan's Social Club during its happy hour. He gives Clash an offer to work for him in his plan to get revenge on Harry Osborn. While sporting the new version of his Clash outfit that he ordered from the Tinkerer, Clayton Cole arrives at Mendel Stromm's apartment where he meets with Stromm in his Robot Master form and his robots. Robot Master then compliments Clash's outfit and claims that Spider-Man will not know what hit him. When Clash attacks Robot Master, stating that he will look out for himself, Robot Master unleashes his robots on Clash even when Spider-Man arrives. Spider-Man manages to web Robot Master in the air with foam webbing. When Spider-Man was talking Clash into getting back to the civilized life, Robot Master rises and attacks them. While Clash flies away, Spider-Man defeats Robot Master by ripping his remote control mechanics from within his robot body, deactivating his robot army.

Mendel Stromm later obtained a Tri-Sentinel from the bunker of the bankrupt Life Foundation, where it faced an Isotope Genome Accelerator duplicate of Spider-Man. After it was defeated, Stromm broke down in tears. He is then approached by a mysterious benefactor who prepared to give him a Master Mold that specializes in creating Tri-Sentinels. After Spider-Man takes control of the Tri-Sentinels and turns them back on their source, Stromm is confronted by his "benefactor," who is the same demon that helped Mysterio. He states that Stromm's usefulness has ended and tears him apart with his centipedes. When Spider-Man is restored to one person following the fight against the Tri-Sentinels, he finds Stromm who quotes "Guess my name" before shutting down.

Powers, abilities, and equipment
Mendel Stromm possesses extensive knowledge of chemistry and robotics for a man in his age. His restorative formula may have granted Stromm minor healing capabilities, but it cost him a near-fatal heart attack. Originally, he must rely on his environmental suit for mobility. As Gaunt, he has an enhanced physique, as well as was outfitted with a gas pack, among other armaments. With the full use of his recuperative qualities, he can access to high-tech equipment, such as various weapons or battlesuits. When Stromm's head is now connected to a cyborg body, it provides him with mental control over his technological creations. His next upgrades are flight, laser projection, and electric discharging.

Other versions

Ultimate Marvel 
Although Mendel Stromm does not have an Ultimate Marvel incarnation, elements of his character are amalgamated into Doctor Octopus's Ultimate Marvel incarnation.

Spider-Verse (2015) 
During the Secret Wars storyline, a version of Mendel Stromm resides in the Battleworld domain of Arachnia. He appears as one of the Oscorp scientists where they are attempting to decipher the Web of Life and Destiny.

In other media

Television 
A character based on Mendel Stromm called Dr. Wardell Stromm appeared in the 1990s Spider-Man animated series episode "Enter the Green Goblin", voiced by Philip Abbott. He was Norman Osborn's assistant and one of the few who knows of Oscorp's connections to the Kingpin.

Film 
Mendel Stromm appears in the 2002 Spider-Man live-action film, portrayed by Ron Perkins. This version is a scientist employed by Oscorp to develop human performance enhancers, though he expresses doubts in their effectiveness due to their test mice demonstrating violent insanity. Despite his doubts, he assists in Norman Osborn's attempts to use an unstable performance enhancing serum on himself. Afterwards, Osborn takes on a violent personality and kills Stromm.

Video games 
 Mendel Stromm makes a minor appearance in the 2002 Spider-Man film tie-in game, voiced by Peter Lurie.
 Mendel Stromm appears in The Amazing Spider-Man video game, voiced by Fred Tatasciore. This version is an Oscorp scientist who is responsible for a cross-species experiment which resulted in a red-bellied piranha / human hybrid codenamed "Nattie". Stromm is later infected by the Cross-Species Virus and attacked by one of Alistair Smythe's Combat Sentries.

References

External links 
 Mendel Stromm at Marvel.com

Comics characters introduced in 1966
Superhero film characters
Fictional characters with electric or magnetic abilities
Fictional characters with superhuman durability or invulnerability
Fictional chemists
Fictional inventors
Fictional professors
Fictional roboticists
Fictional technopaths
Marvel Comics characters with accelerated healing
Marvel Comics characters with superhuman strength
Marvel Comics cyborgs
Marvel Comics mutates
Marvel Comics scientists
Marvel Comics supervillains
Marvel Comics male supervillains
Characters created by Stan Lee
Characters created by Steve Ditko
Spider-Man characters